Jan Willem van Erven Dorens (born 8 November 1934) is a retired field hockey player from the Netherlands. He competed  at the 1960 Summer Olympics where his team finished in ninth place. He was the Olympic flag bearer for the Netherlands at those Games.

Van Erven Dorens has an elder sister, Marguérite, and a younger brother Robbie, an amateur golfer. Their father, Jan Frederik, was an architect, rower and hockey goalkeeper.

References

External links
 

1934 births
Living people
Dutch male field hockey players
Field hockey players at the 1960 Summer Olympics
Olympic field hockey players of the Netherlands
Field hockey players from Amsterdam
20th-century Dutch people